The peritoneum of the anterior pelvic wall covers the superior surface of the bladder, and on either side of this viscus forms a depression, termed the paravesical fossa, which is limited laterally by the fold of peritoneum covering the ductus deferens.

The size of this fossa is dependent on the state of distension of the bladder; when the bladder is empty, a variable fold of peritoneum, the plica vesicalis transversa, divides the fossa into two portions.

External links
  - "The Female Pelvis: Distribution of the Peritoneum in the Female Pelvis"

References

Pelvis